Radel may refer to :

 Trey Radel (born 1976), American politician
 Radel Fazleev (born 1996), Russian ice hockey player
 Radel Electronics, an Indian manufacturer of the electronic tanpura

 The commercial name of the polymer polyphenylsulfone (PPSU)

See also
 Radell Lockhart (born 1979), American football player
 Philippe Petit-Radel (1749–1815), French physician and botanist